The Bedford Hotel is a hotel on the seafront in Brighton, England which has subsequently been renamed the Holiday Inn Brighton after becoming a part of the Holiday Inn business.

The original hotel dated from 1829, but the current building opened in 1967.

History
Pre-dating Brighton's more famous Grand Hotel by over 30 years, the Bedford opened in October 1829, having been built for William Manfield. The late Georgian-style hotel was subsequently leased to its designer, Thomas Cooper, in 1835. This arrangement lasted only until the following year, after which Manfield ran it again until 1844 when he leased it to Joseph Ellis. In 1855 Ellis purchased the hotel outright. As a fashionable hotel in a fashionable resort town, the Bedford attracted many celebrity guests and even royalty. Amongst the guests was Charles Dickens, who wrote Dombey and Son while staying at the hotel.

In 1866 the West Pier was built, by Eugenius Birch; it meets the seafront opposite Regency Square, very close to the hotel.

The International Gun and Polo Club, founded by George Mashall in 1874, was based in the Bedford Hotel, though the grounds were located in Preston Village, Brighton, probably at Preston Park.

The original Bedford Hotel, Brighton was mentioned in the patter of the English music hall song "By the Sea", as recorded in 1910 by Mark Sheridan, who popularised the more famous "I Do Like To be Beside the Seaside". The song was composed by Billy Williams and Fred Godfrey.

Mr. A. J. Morriss (often referred to as “AJ”), bought the hotel in 1947 and made numerous alterations and improvements to it. It is believed that his all stainless steel kitchen and utensils was the first to be installed in any hotel in England. He also had a proper sprung dance floor put in, so that they could extend the use of the dining-room. Whilst refurbishing the bedrooms other rooms were found hidden behind fireplaces which were being dismantled.

Unfortunately, one evening, Morriss was attacked with a heavy hydrant key to his head by a young man, who unbeknownst to anyone, had recently been discharged from a psychiatric hospital, who was staying at the hotel with his mother. He made medical history at the time by having brain surgery whilst still conscious – he eventually recovered, but his eyesight was greatly impaired.

Morriss sold the hotel in 1961.

By 1963 the hotel was owned by AVP Industries, and in that year there was controversy surrounding their desire to replace the building with a modern 14-storey tower block. Shortly after this, on 1 April 1964, the original building was destroyed by a fire — with the death of two people.

The hotel was rebuilt on the same site, re-opening on 16 September 1967. The 168-feet tall, 17-storey block was designed by R. Seifert and Partners as a 127-room hotel and also a section of private domestic flats, known as Bedford Towers.

In April 1974, the hotel accommodated many of the competitors in that year’s Eurovision Song Contest, held in the city. Winners ABBA fortuitously stayed in the Napoleon Suite.

As of 2007 the hotel has 131 guest rooms, a cocktail lounge and restaurant.

Architecture
The original hotel had five storeys with two recessed Ionic porticoes facing south and west above the entrances. Its west wing (the first part to open) was recessed from the road and decorated with giant pilasters. The interior had a Grecian hall with Ionic columns and a glazed dome.

The modern replacement building bears no resemblance to its predecessor. There is a tower with balconies on most floors in a staggered arrangement, atop a broad ground floor section; the ground floor has large windows and a covered terrace which serves as a porte-cochère.

References

1829 establishments in England
Hotels in Brighton and Hove
Hotel buildings completed in 1829
Hotels established in 1829